The 48th New Zealand Parliament was a term of the Parliament of New Zealand. Its composition was determined at a general election held on 17 September 2005. The new parliament met for the first time on 7 November 2005. It was dissolved on 3 October 2008.

The Labour Party and the Progressive Party, backed by New Zealand First and United Future, established a majority at the beginning the 48th Parliament. The Labour-led administration was in its third term. The National Party and ACT form the formal opposition to the government. Other non-government parties are the Greens (who promised to abstain on confidence and supply votes) and the Māori Party.

The 48th Parliament consists of 121 representatives. This represents an overhang of one seat, with the Māori Party having won one more electorates than its share of the vote would otherwise have given it. In total, sixty-nine of the MPs were chosen by geographical electorates, including seven Māori electorates. The remainder were elected by means of party-list proportional representation under the MMP electoral system.

Electorate boundaries for 48th Parliament

Oath of office
All the Māori Party MPs tried to alter their Oath of office by adding references to the Treaty of Waitangi. They all had to retake their oaths.

Election result

Government: the third and final term of the Fifth Labour Government, in power from 1999 until 2008; minority coalition with Progressive Party since 2002
Prime Minister: Helen Clark (Labour) from 1999 to 2008
Governor General: Dame Silvia Cartwright to August 2006; Anand Satyanand August 2006– 
Deputy Prime Minister: Michael Cullen (Labour) 2002–2008
Leader of the Opposition: Don Brash (National Party), to November 2006; John Key (National) November 2006 – 
Speaker : Margaret Wilson (Labour) 
Deputy Speaker: Clem Simich (National) 
Assistant Speaker: Ross Robertson (Labour) and Ann Hartley (Labour)
Leader of the House: Michael Cullen (Labour)

Members of the 48th Parliament
48th New Zealand Parliament - MPs elected to Parliament

List MPs are ordered by allocation as determined by the Chief Electoral Office and the party lists.

Changes during parliamentary term

Rod Donald, co-leader of the Green Party, died on 6 November 2005 before he was sworn in as a member of the 48th Parliament. He was replaced by the next person on the Green Party's list, former MP Nándor Tánczos, on 16 November.
Jim Sutton, a Labour list MP, retired from politics on 31 July 2006. He was replaced by the next person on the Labour Party's list, Charles Chauvel.
Don Brash, a National list MP and former leader of the National Party, retired from Parliament on 7 February 2007. He was replaced by the next person on the National Party's list, Katrina Shanks.
 Georgina Beyer, a Labour list MP, announced her retirement on 15 December 2006, and officially resigned from Parliament when it resumed on 13 February 2007. On 20 February she was replaced by the next person on the Labour Party's list, former MP Lesley Soper.
Taito Phillip Field, Labour MP for Mangere, quit the Labour party after being threatened with expulsion on 16 February 2007. He continued to serve as an MP, and formed the New Zealand Pacific Party in January 2008.
Gordon Copeland, a United Future list MP, left the party to become an independent MP in May 2007, and contested the 2008 election as a candidate for The Kiwi Party.
Ann Hartley, a Labour list MP, was elected to the North Shore City Council in the 2007 local body elections. She left Parliament when it resumed in 2008, and was replaced by the next person on the Labour list, Louisa Wall, a former Silver Ferns netballer, on 4 February 2008.
 Brian Donnelly, a New Zealand First MP, resigned from Parliament from 12 February 2008, and was replaced by Dail Jones on 15 February 2008. Donnelly was appointed as New Zealand's High Commissioner to the Cook Islands.
Dianne Yates, a Labour list MP, stood unsuccessfully for the Hamilton City Council in the 2007 local body elections. She resigned as an MP on 29 March 2008 and was replaced by William Sio on 1 April 2008 as the next person on Labour's list.
Nándor Tánczos resigned from Parliament and was replaced by Green Party co-leader Russel Norman on 27 June 2008.

Seating plan

Start of term 
The chamber is in a horseshoe-shape.

End of term 
The chamber is in a horseshoe-shape.

See also
Caucuses and MPs' responsibilities in the 48th New Zealand Parliament

References

New Zealand parliaments